Retaria is a clade within the supergroup Rhizaria containing the Foraminifera and the Radiolaria. In 2019, the Retaria were recognized as a basal Rhizaria group, as sister of the Cercozoa.

References

External links

 
Taxa named by Thomas Cavalier-Smith
SAR supergroup phyla